Nicolai Mincev (born 20 October 1972) is a retired Moldovan football defender.

References

1972 births
Living people
Moldovan footballers
CS Tiligul-Tiras Tiraspol players
FC Tiraspol players
FC Nistru Otaci players
FC Spartak Semey players
FC Dacia Chișinău players
FC Nasaf players
FC Iskra-Stal players
CSF Bălți players
Association football defenders
Moldovan expatriate footballers
Expatriate footballers in Kazakhstan
Moldovan expatriate sportspeople in Kazakhstan
Expatriate footballers in Uzbekistan
Moldovan expatriate sportspeople in Uzbekistan